Castel Sant'Angelo is a mausoleum and castle in Rome, Italy. It may also refer to:

Castel Sant'Angelo, Lazio
Castel Sant'Angelo (Licata)
Angelokastro (Corfu)

See also
Fort St. Angelo in Birgu, Malta
St. Angelo Fort in Kannur, 🇮🇳